Chahardangeh Rural District may refer to:
 Chahardangeh Rural District (Chaharbagh County), Alborz province
 Chahardangeh Rural District (Hurand County), East Azerbaijan province
 Chahardangeh Rural District (Mazandaran Province)
 Chahardangeh Rural District (Eslamshahr County), Tehran province

See also
 Chahardangeh District (disambiguation)